Veerannapeta is a village and gram panchayat in Kondurg mandal of Ranga Reddy district in Telangana, India.

It is located about 7 kilometers from Kondurg and 39 kilometers from Mahbubnagar town.

Demographics
According to Indian census, 2001, the demographic details of this village is as follows:
 Total Population: 	1,850 in 355 Households.
 Male Population: 	958 and Female Population: 	892
 Children Under 6-years of age: 318 (Boys - 168 and Girls - 150)
 Total Literates: 	540

References

Villages in Ranga Reddy district